Red Cedar Lake may refer to:

Red Cedar Lake (Connecticut), United States
Red Cedar Lake (Ontario), Canada
Red Cedar Lake (Wisconsin), United States